Rhacophorus barisani is a species of frog in the family Rhacophoridae endemic to Indonesia. Its natural habitats are subtropical or tropical moist montane forests, rivers, and freshwater marshes.
It is threatened by habitat loss.

References

Amphibians of Indonesia
barisani
Taxonomy articles created by Polbot
Amphibians described in 2002